may refer to:

 Eniwa, Hokkaido, a city in Japan
 Mount Eniwa, a volcano in Ishikari, Hokkaidō, Japan

ja:恵庭